Bilal Saad Mubarak (18 December 1972 – 27 October 2018) was a Qatari shot putter. His best finishes include eleventh place at the 1995 World Championships and tenth place at the 1996 Olympic Games. He also has silver medals from the Asian Championships in 1991, 1993 and 2000 and gold medals from 1995, 1998, 2002 and 2003, as well as a silver medal from the 2002 Asian Games.

Other regional achievements include gold at the Pan Arab Games in 1992, 1997 and 1999, gold at the West Asian Games in 2002 and 2005 and gold at the Pan Arab Championships every two years between 1991 and 2003. His personal best is 19.65 metres, achieved in September 1997 in Taïf. He died on 27 October 2018 at the age of 45

Achievements

External links

Bilal Saad Mubarak's obituary 

1972 births
2018 deaths
Qatari male shot putters
Athletes (track and field) at the 1992 Summer Olympics
Athletes (track and field) at the 1996 Summer Olympics
Athletes (track and field) at the 2000 Summer Olympics
Olympic athletes of Qatar
Asian Games medalists in athletics (track and field)
Athletes (track and field) at the 1994 Asian Games
Athletes (track and field) at the 2002 Asian Games
People from Taif
Asian Games silver medalists for Qatar
Medalists at the 2002 Asian Games